Marina Bravo Bragado (born 2 July 1989) is a Spanish rugby sevens player. She competed at the 2016 Summer Olympics as a member of the Spanish women's national rugby sevens team. She was also part of the team that won the final qualifying spot for Rio. Previously she played in Club de Rugby Majadahonda and Colegio Cisneros Rugby Club. 

Bravo was also a member of their 2013 Rugby World Cup Sevens team.

References

External links 
 
 
 

1989 births
Living people
Spain international women's rugby union players
Spain international women's rugby sevens players
Olympic rugby sevens players of Spain
Rugby sevens players at the 2016 Summer Olympics
Sportspeople from Madrid
Rugby union players from the Community of Madrid